Tawkify is a dating intermediary company which employs human matchmakers.

Overview
In contrast to contemporary dating websites and services like Tinder or Match.com, users do not see photographs or personal information about any other user. This way users do not conduct directly the screening process. Rather, users create private profiles and Tawkify employs human "Matchmakers" (including founder E. Jean Carroll) to pair members, by identifying profiles that they believe share common interests and values. The Matchmakers plan dates and collect feedback from both parties after each date in order to tune future matches.

Tawkify facilitates opposite-sex and same-sex relationships in the United States and Canada.

History

Tawkify was founded by Kenneth Shaw and E. Jean Carroll. According to The New York Times, "The two met years ago, when Ms. Carroll sought out Mr. Shaw...to help her design her own app".

The company's website launched in January 2012.

See also
 Comparison of online dating websites

References

External links
 Tawkify.com
 Betabeat.com
 Video of E. Jean Carroll, Sam Yagan, Amarnath Thombre, and Brian Schechter at Internet Week New York
 Matchmaker Charlee Ziegler interviewed by Michelle Skeen PsyD

Online dating services of the United States
Internet properties established in 2012